O Bar da TV was a reality television show in Portugal, based on The Bar . The show was started on 13 May 2001. It aired on SIC channel. The presenter was Jorge Gabriel.

Contestants

Nominations

References

Portuguese reality television series
2001 Portuguese television series debuts
2001 Portuguese television series endings
2000s Portuguese television series